Shawn N. Bratton (born 1968) is a United States Air Force major general who serves as the first commander of Space Training and Readiness Command.

Education 
 1993 Bachelor of Arts in Secondary Education, Arizona State University, Tempe, Arizona
 1999 Squadron Officer School, Maxwell AFB, Alabama
 2005 Air Command and Staff College (ACSC), by correspondence
 2010 Air War College, by correspondence
 2011 United States Naval War College, in residence
 2011 Master of Science in National Security Studies, United States Naval War College, Newport, Rhode Island
 2020 Enterprise Leadership Seminar (ELS), University of North Carolina, Chapel Hill, NC
 2020 Leading Strategically, CCL Campus, Colorado Springs, CO
 2021 Senior Leader Orientation Course (SLOC), Arlington, VA

Assignments 
1. April 1987 - December 1987, Student, Aircraft Control and Early Warning Systems, Keesler AFB, Miss.
2. January 1988 - September 1994, Aircraft Control and Warning Radar Technician, 107th Air Control Squadron, Arizona Air National Guard, Phoenix, Ariz.
3. September 1994 - October 1994, Student, Academy of Military Science, Knoxville, Tenn.
4. October 1994 - August 1999, Communications Officer, 107th Air Control Squadron, Phoenix, Ariz.
5. August 1999 - March 2000, Operations Officer, Joint Counter-Narcotics Task Force, Phoenix, Ariz.
6. March 2000 - December 2003, Action Officer, HQ AFSPC/CG, Peterson AFB, Colo.
7. January 2003 - June 2003, Student, USAF Weapons School, Nellis AFB, Nev.
8. July 2003 - July 2005, Weapons and Tactics, HQ AFSPC/A3, Peterson AFB, Colo.
9. August 2005 - July 2007, Weapons Officer, Det 2, AZ ANG, Sky Harbor IAP, Phoenix, Ariz.
10. August 2007 - July 2010, ANG Advisor to 14th Air Force, Vandenberg AFB, Calif
11. August 2010 - June 2011, Student, Naval War College, Newport, R.I.
12. June 2011 - February 2014, ANG Advisor to AFSPC/A3 & A6, Peterson AFB, Colo.
13. March 2014 - May 2015, ANG Advisor to the Commander, AFSPC, Peterson AFB, Colo.
14. May 2015 - June 2017, Cyber Ops Group Commander, 175th Wing, Warfield ANG Base, Md.
15. July 2017 - January 2018, ANG Advisor to the Commander, AFSPC, Peterson AFB, Colo.
16. April 2019 - August 2019, Special Assistant to Chief, National Guard Bureau for Space, National Guard Bureau, Peterson AFB, CO
17. August 2019 - January 2021, Deputy Director, J3, USSPACECOM, CO
18. February 2021 - August 2021, Space Training and Readiness Command Planning Lead, Peterson AFB, Colo.
19. February 2021 – present, Commander, Space Training and Readiness Command, Peterson Space Force Base, Colorado

Awards and decorations
Bratton is the recipient of the following awards:

Dates of promotion

References 

Living people
Place of birth missing (living people)
United States Air Force generals
1968 births